William Dewberry (September 5, 1874 – September 1, 1946) was an American Negro league pitcher in the 1900s.

A native of Rome, Georgia, Dewberry played for the Leland Giants in 1908. In five recorded appearances on the mound, he posted a 4.95 ERA over 40 innings. Dewberry died in Chicago, Illinois in 1946 at age 71.

References

External links
Baseball statistics and player information from Baseball-Reference Black Baseball Stats and Seamheads

1874 births
1946 deaths
Leland Giants players
Baseball pitchers
Baseball players from Georgia (U.S. state)
Sportspeople from Rome, Georgia
20th-century African-American people